Plasmodium torrealbai is a parasite of the genus Plasmodium subgenus Lacertaemoba. As in all Plasmodium species P. torrealbai has both vertebrate and insect hosts. The vertebrate hosts for this parasite are reptiles.

Taxonomy
The parasite was first described by Scorza and Dagbert in 1957.

Description 
The trophozoites are irregularly shaped with filiform extensions.

The schizonts contain 8 to 20 nuclei arranged in a fan.

Pigment is present at the base of the fan.

The merozoites are elongate.

The gametocytes are ovoid to elongate.

Distribution 
This species is found in Venezuela.

Vectors
Not known.

Hosts 
This species has been found in Anolis species.

References 

torrealbai